Jayanta Kumar Ghosh (Bengali: জয়ন্ত কুমার ঘোষ, 23 May 1937 – 30 September 2017) was an Indian statistician, an emeritus professor at Indian Statistical Institute and a professor of statistics at Purdue University.

Education
He obtained a B.S. from Presidency College, then affiliated with the University of Calcutta, and subsequently a M.A. and a Ph.D. from the University of Calcutta under the supervision of H. K. Nandi. He started his research career in the early 1960s, studying sequential analysis as a graduate student in the department of statistics at the University of Calcutta.

Research
Among his best-known discoveries are the Bahadur–Ghosh–Kiefer representation (with R. R. Bahadur and Jack Kiefer) and the Ghosh–Pratt identity along with John W. Pratt.

His research contributions fall within the fields of:
 Bayesian inference
 Asymptotics
 Modeling and model selection
 High dimensional data analysis
 Nonparametric regression and density estimation
 Survival analysis
 Statistical genetics

Awards and honors
 Elected member of the International Statistical Institute
 Advisory editor, Journal of Statistical Planning and Inference
 Fellow of the Institute of Mathematical Statistics
 Fellow of the Indian National Science Academy
 Life member and director of the Calcutta Statistical Association
 Fellow of the Indian Academy of Sciences
 Japanese Society for Promotion of Sciences Fellowship, 1978
 Shanti Swarup Bhatnagar Prize for Science and Technology, 1981
 President, Statistics Section of the Indian Science Congress Association, 1991
 President, International Statistical Institute, 1993
 Mahalanobis Gold Medal of Indian Science Congress Association, 1998
 Invited speaker of the International Congress of Mathematicians, 1998
 P. V. Sukhatme Prize for Statistics, 2000
 Mahalanobis Memorial Lecture, State Science and Technology Congress, W. Bengal, 2003
 D.Sc. (h.c.), B.C. Roy Agricultural University, W. Bengal, India, 2006
 International Indian Statistical Association (IISA) Lifetime Achievement Award, 2010 
 Padma Shree (2014) by the Government of India

Bibliography
He has published over 50 research papers. He has also published four books, which are:
 Invariance in Testing and Estimation (Lecture Notes), 1967, published by Indian Statistical Institute, Calcutta.
 Higher Order Asymptotics (based on CBMS-NSF lecture), published jointly by Institute of Mathematical Statistics and American Statistical Association, 1994.
 (with R.V. Ramamoorthi) Bayesian Nonparametrics (Springer 2003).
 (with Mohan Delampady and Tapas Samanta) An Introduction to Bayesian Analysis - Theory and Methods, Springer 2006.

References

External links
Indian Statistical Institute Statistics Department homepage
Dr. Ghosh's profile at Purdue University 
Dr. Ghosh's webpage at the Statistics Department of Purdue University 
A biography of Dr. Ghosh written by Professor Anirban Dasgupta

1937 births
2017 deaths
Scientists from Kolkata
Indian statisticians
Purdue University faculty
University of Calcutta alumni
Indian Statistical Institute alumni
Recipients of the Shanti Swarup Bhatnagar Award in Mathematical Science
Presidents of the International Statistical Institute
Bengali mathematicians
Recipients of the Padma Shri in science & engineering
20th-century Indian mathematicians
Mathematical statisticians